This is a list of newspapers in Ethiopia.

List of newspapers

See also
 Mass media in Ethiopia: Newspapers
 Internet in Ethiopia
 List of radio stations in Africa: Ethiopia

References

Bibliography

External links
 

 
Ethiopia
newspapers